Battaglin is a surname. Notable people with the surname include:

 Enrico Battaglin (born 1989), Italian cyclist
 Giovanni Battaglin (born 1951), Italian cyclist

See also
 Battaglia (surname)
 Battaglini